Rhonda Bates (born 1949) is an American actress.

Bates was best known for playing geeky, man-hungry, hillbilly tomboys in TV shows and films of the 1970s. She was a gangly 6'2" tall with a wide toothy smile, curly hair and an unmistakable southern down-home drawl.

Early life

Bates grew up in Evansville, Indiana. She received her master's degree in drama from the University of Arkansas. She was a member of Chi Omega fraternity and so is her daughter. She then taught health and physical education at Cynthia Heights Elementary School in Evansville before heading for California in 1975.

Career

Bates first received attention doing a standup comedy act at The Comedy Store. She was noticed by a producer who hired her for
a Don Rickles TV special.

In 1975, Bates was hired as a featured player on the short-lived variety sketch show Keep on Truckin''' featuring Didi Conn, Fred Travalena and Wayland Flowers.

Bates became a semi-regular on Rickles' sitcom CPO Sharkey (1976–78) as the love-interest of 6'7" tall Seaman Pruitt (played by actor Peter Isacksen).

Bates went on to co-star on Blansky's Beauties (a 1977 spin-off of Happy Days) where she played “Arkansas” a gawky Vegas showgirl. She also appeared on the short-lived sitcom The Roller Girls as roller derby queen “Mongo Sue Lampert”. Bates also guest starred in a Love Boat episode where she played an ugly stepsister in a ‘Cinderella’ storyline.

In 1979, Rhonda Bates played “Enid” in Gabe Kaplan’s college basketball comedy  film Fast Break.

In 1980, Bates was in the film Roadie (film), co-starring rocker Meat Loaf and comedy legend Art Carney.

She followed her various film & TV, game show, Battle of the Network Stars appearances with a co-hosting role on 1980sSpeak Up, America (a Real People'' – inspired TV magazine / reality show). One of her co-hosts was former-child-evangelist-turned-actor Marjoe Gortner.

Rhonda Bates continued to work in a few TV guest shots up until 1988, then apparently quit acting around age 40. She now lives in Texas.

External links

 http://www.rip-her-to-shreds.com/archive_press_others_roadiepresskit.php Roadie press kit bio

American film actresses
American television actresses
Living people
1949 births
University of Arkansas alumni
21st-century American women